Interstate 85 Business (I-85 Bus; commonly referred to as Business 85) in the US state of North Carolina is a  business loop of Interstate 85 (I-85) which serves several cities in the Piedmont Triad.

Route description
I-85 Bus, which completely runs concurrently with US Highway 29 (US 29) and US 70, begins at a partial Y interchange with I-85 (exit 87) in Lexington. Changing to a semi-limited expressway, it serves as a northern bypass of downtown Lexington, briefly running concurrently with US 64. After leaving the city limits, I-85 Bus heads in a northeast direction in parallel to I-85 further south. After it travels through Thomasville, it enters the city of High Point in Davidson–Randolph county line. East of downtown High Point, I-85 Bus shares a unique three-level diamond interchange with I-74/US 311 before leaving the city limits. At the Greensboro city limit, I-85 Bus completes its  journey with a trumpet interchange with I-85 (exit 118).

History

Established in 1984 as redesignation of Temp I-85, I-85 Bus traveled from Lexington to Greensboro, in a complete concurrency with US 29 and US 70, when I-85 was completed on a more southern parallel routing.

The extension included a hidden  concurrency along I-85 (between exits 118–120A) before splitting off again with US 29 and US 70. In merging onto I-40 (exit 219), it continued easterly before meeting back with I-85 (exit 227) near McLeansville. For a brief period in 2008, I-40 was also decommissioned through Greensboro and rerouted around the Urban Loop, with its old routing replaced by I-40 Bus, but its former in-town route was eventually restored, resulting once again in a regular and business Interstate sharing the same alignment. In October 2018, I-85 Bus was reverted to its original  alignment, ending near Jamestown. The justification was to eliminate a redundant route and decrease the number of routing shields and overhead signs through Greensboro.

Temporary Interstate 85

Temporary Interstate 85 (Temp I-85) was established by 1961 as a temporary designation that directed travelers along US 29/US 70, from the Yadkin River to Greensboro. In 1977, a flyover bridge was completed (dubbed "bridge over nothing", it later became part of I-85 exit 87), truncating Temp I-85 south-end near Lexington. In 1984, I-85 was completed on new primary routing between Lexington and Greensboro; Temp I-85 was replaced by I-85 Bus.

Future
On October 5, 2019, the North Carolina Department of Transportation (NCDOT) submitted an application to the American Association of State Highway and Transportation Officials (AASHTO) and received approval to decommission I-85 Bus along its entire route, as well as to reroute US 70 to continue along Wendover Avenue westbound through Greensboro to North Carolina Highway 68 (NC 68, Eastchester Drive) in High Point, and then onto NC 68, southbound from High Point to Thomasville. Under the state plan, all I-85 Bus and US 70 signs will be removed from the freeway stretch traveling southwesterly from I-40 in Greensboro to NC 68 in Thomasville, and the freeway will remain US 29. The state's justification for this is that the route changes will provide a single continuous route as an alternative (US 70 will take a more direct routing through town), simplify overhead signage on the freeway (eliminate confusion between the I-85 bypass and I-85 Bus), and remove traffic from Interstate concurrencies in order to improve safety and regional connectivity.

Junction list

References

External links

 I-85 Business at NCRoads.com
 I-85 Temp at NCRoads.com

85 Business
85 Business (North Carolina)
Business (North Carolina)
Transportation in Davidson County, North Carolina
Transportation in Randolph County, North Carolina
Transportation in Guilford County, North Carolina
Transportation in Greensboro, North Carolina